The 23rd Emmy Awards, later known as the 23rd Primetime Emmy Awards, were handed out on May 9, 1971.  The ceremony was hosted by Johnny Carson.  Winners are listed in bold and series' networks are in parentheses.

The top shows of the night were All in the Family and The Bold Ones: The Senator. The Bold Ones: The Senator, along with other shows, had the most major nominations (nine) and wins (four) on the night.

Actress Lee Grant set an Emmy milestone when she joined the exclusive club of actors who were nominated for two performances in the same acting category. She won the award for Outstanding Single Performance by an Actress in a Leading Role, for her performance in The Neon Ceiling, she was also nominated for an episode of Columbo.

Susan Hampshire became PBS' first win in the Lead Actress, Drama category, for The First Churchills, as well as being the network's first ever Acting win. (Hampshire also won in the same category, the previous year, again beating the Big Three television networks, but from the NET network, a network which dissolved within a year, but became the direct predecessor for PBS.)

David Burns became the second posthumous performance in Emmy history to win, for ITV Sunday Night Theatre.

Winners and nominees

Programs

Acting

Lead performances

Supporting performances

Single performances

Directing

Writing

Most major nominations
By network 
 NBC – 46
 CBS – 29
 ABC – 23
 PBS – 11

 By program
 The Bold Ones: The Senator (NBC) / Hallmark Hall of Fame (NBC) – 9
 Mary Tyler Moore (CBS) – 8
 All in the Family (CBS) – 7
 The Flip Wilson Show (NBC) / Marcus Welby, M.D. (ABC) / The Odd Couple (ABC) / Vanished (NBC) – 4

Most major awards
By network 
 NBC – 14
 CBS – 9
 PBS – 5
 ABC – 3

 By program
 The Bold Ones: The Senator (NBC) / Hallmark Hall of Fame (NBC) / Mary Tyler Moore (CBS) – 4
 All in the Family (CBS) – 3

Notes

References

External links
 Emmys.com list of 1971 Nominees & Winners
 

023
Primetime Emmy Awards
Primetime Emmy Awards
Primetime Emmy Awards